Doctor Neighbor is a 1916 American silent feature film black and white melodrama. The film was directed by Lloyd B. Carleton. It stars Hobart Bosworth and pairs Dorothy Davenport and Emory Johnson in leading roles.

The film explores the moral dilemma of whether a doctor should assist a patient in taking their own life when the patient is in great pain and facing imminent death.

The movie was released on May 1, 1916, by Universal.

Plot
Dr. Joel Neighbor is a famous 42-year-old surgeon. He has built up vast medical knowledge through his years of practice and has dedicated his life to saving people. His ward, Hazel Rogers, is a beautiful 18-year-old heiress. She lives with her mother. Dr. Neighbor is the guardian of Hazel's fortune until she turns 21. In the event of her death, the doctor would become the heir to the estate.

Now that Hazel is coming of age, Dr. Neighbor asks her to become his wife. Hazel graciously declines his proposal. Hazel tells the doctor; she is in love with a district attorney named Hamilton Powers. Hazel has already promised to marry him. The doctor is against the marriage but accepts her reasons and bows out.

After Hazel marries Hamilton Powers, she realizes he is aloof and utterly committed to his law practice. Powers is respectful of Hazel but loves Hazel's close friend, a nurse named Christine Hall.

Powers asks Dr. Neighbor to transfer his trustee rights to Hazel's estate, but Dr. Neighbor refuses the request. After being rebuffed, Powers becomes even colder in his treatment of Hazel. After a few months of marriage, Powers leaves Hazel's magnificent home on Long Island to go to New York City. He claims he will have more opportunities to practice law in the big city.

Two guests arrive at Hazel's home to console her in her loneliness, Mrs. Preston and Morgan Keith. While the group is engaged in a friendly discussion, Powers shows up from New York City. Hazel and Hamilton have a bitter disagreement.

Hazel is distraught and goes for a drive in her car. While driving too fast, she has an accident that fractures her back and leaves her a helpless invalid. Dr. Neighbor attends to her, and Nurse Christine shows up to help care for her friend.

One night Hazel is in unbearable pain and cries out to Dr. Neighbor to put her out of her misery. Even though he still loves Hazel, the doctor must follow his oath. Christine, overwrought by her friend's agony and suffering, administers a fatal dose of morphine. After completing the deed, Christine forgets to dispose of the hypodermic needle and inadvertently leaves it on the table. Hazel will never awake. Dr. Neighbor enters the room, finds the needle, and puts it in his pocket.

Later, the authorities discover the needle that administered the fatal dose of morphine in the doctor's pocket. Since there is no love lost between Powers and Neighbor, Powers calls for an immediate inquiry. Hamilton points out that Hazel's death leaves Dr. Neighbor as the sole beneficiary of her fortune. The doctor keeps quiet during the entire criminal investigation. After they complete the inquiry, they charge Dr. Neighbor with murder. He must stand trial for homicide. During the trial, Christine becomes overwhelmed with remorse and confesses to the crime. After Christine's confession, they release Dr. Neighbor.

Hamilton Powers suffers from heart failure and needs a massive transfusion of blood to survive. Dr. Neighbor has the same blood type as Powers and donates his blood so that Powers may live.

Christine, freed from her prison term, pays a visit to Dr. Neighbor. She discovers him dead from exhaustion and loss of blood.

Cast

Production

Pre-production

Development
According to the book - The Universal Story, Carl Laemmle (1867-1939) produced around 91 movies in 1916.
Lloyd B. Carleton (–1933) started working for Carl Laemmle in the Fall of 1915. Carleton arrived with impeccable credentials, having directed some 60 films for the likes of Thanhouser, Lubin, Fox, and Selig. 
Between March and December 1916, 44-year-old Lloyd Carleton directed 16 movies for Universal, starting with The Yaqui and ending with The Morals of Hilda. Emory Johnson acted in all 16 of these films. Of Carleton's total 1916 output, 11 were feature films, and the rest were two-reel shorts.

In 1916, Carleton directed 13 films pairing Dorothy Davenport and Emory Johnson. This film would be the first in the 13-film series. These totals show Carl Laemmle was clearly giving the Davenport-Johnson pairing one of his elite directors from the working cadre of universal directors to produce the screen chemistry Laemmle was seeking.

Casting
Hobart Van Zandt Bosworth (1867-1943) was  years old when he starred in this movie as Dr. Joel Neighbor. Bosworth was a well-known Universal actor.  After Universal signed a 21-year-old Emory Johnson, Hobart thought he saw a potential mega-career for the 21-year-old. Hobart decided to mentor the young actor. After finishing The Yaqui released March 1916, they immediately made another feature-length Western -  Two Men of Sandy Bar released in April. Later in the year, Emory would make two more films with Bosworth. They would continue collaborating in other films in the coming years. In Bosworth's long cinematic career, he appeared in nearly 300 films.
Dorothy Davenport (1895-1977) was an established star for Universal when the  year-old actress played Hazel Rogers. She had acted in hundreds of movies by the time she starred in this film. The majority of these films were 2-reel shorts, as was the norm in Hollywood's teen years. She had been making movies since 1910. She started dating Wally Reid when she was barely 16, and he was 20. They married in 1913. After her husband died in 1923, she used the name "Mrs. Wallace Reid" in the credits for any project she took part in. Besides being an actress, she would eventually become a film director, producer, and writer.
Emory Johnson (1894-1960) was  years old when he acted in this movie as Hamilton Powers. In January 1916, Emory signed a contract with Universal Film Manufacturing Company. Carl Laemmle of Universal Film Manufacturing Company thought he saw great potential in Johnson, so he chooses him to be Universal's new leading man. Laemmle's hope was Johnson would become another Wallace Reed. A major part of his plan was to create a movie couple that would sizzle on the silver screen. Laemmle thought Dorothy Davenport and Emory Johnson could create the chemistry he sought. Johnson and Davenport would complete 13 films together. They started with the successful feature production of this movie in May 1916 and ended with The Devil's Bondwoman in November 1916. After completing the last movie, Laemmle thought Johnson did not have the screen presence he wanted. He decided not to renew his contract. Johnson would make 17 movies in 1916, including 6 shorts and 11 feature-length Dramas. 1916 would become the second-highest movie output of his entire acting career. Emory acted in  25 films for Universal, mostly dramas with a sprinkling of comedies and westerns.
Gretchen Lederer (1891-1955) was  years old when she portrayed Christine Hall. The German actress got her first start in 1912 with Carl Laemmle of Universal Film Manufacturing Company.  At the time of this film, she was still a Universal contract actress. She would unite with Emory Johnson in the 1916 productions of A Yoke of Gold and The Morals of Hilda.
Adele Farrington (Mrs. Hobart Bosworth) (-1936) was  years old when she portrayed Mrs. Preston. She was also a Universal contract player appearing in 74 films between 1914 and 1926. Although she got her start in movies when she was 47-years-old (1914), Universal cast her mostly in character leads. Many of her roles were acting alongside her husband, Hobart Bosworth, who married in 1909 and divorced in 1920. In addition to her roles as an actress, she was also a music composer and writer.

Themes
This movie explores the practice of euthanasia or Mercy killing. It dramatized the moral dilemma doctors face when presented with these choices:
assist a patient in taking their own life, knowing the patient has an untreatable condition and is in great pain.
Let the patient live knowing their remaining existence will involve great suffering and pain. 
Is helping a patient of their incurable suffering a breach of their Hippocratic Oath?

Filming
The movie was filmed in the studio complex at Universal Studios located at 100 Universal City Plaza in  Universal City, California. The photoplay was filmed sometime between January and early February 1916.

Alternate title
This film had several alternate titles including:
Doctor Samson
Dr. Neighbor
Dr. Neighbor, or A Law for the Detective
Dr. Samson

Post production
The theatrical release of this film totaled five reels or 4,921 feet of film. As is often the case, the listed time for this feature-length movie varies. The average time per 1,000-foot 35mm reel varied between ten and fifteen minutes per reel at the time. Thus, the total time for this movie is computed between fifty and seventy-five minutes.

Release and reception

This film was officially released on May 1, 1916. It carried Universal's "Red Feather" brand, designating a low-budget feature film. The critics generally liked this film and its sensitive subject matter.

In the May 6, 1916, issue of the New York Clipper, Len wrote:

In the April 22, 1916 issue of the Motion Picture News, Peter Milne wrote:

In the April 22, 1916 issue of The Moving Picture World, Robert C. McElravy wrote:

Preservation status
According to the Library of Congress, all known copies of this film are lost.

Gallery

References

External links

Katchmer, George A. A Biographical Dictionary of Silent Film Western Actors and Actresses, McFarland, 2002, p. 204.

List of Universal Pictures films (1912–1919)
Universal Pictures
List of American films of 1916

1916 lost films
1916 drama films
1916 films
American black-and-white films
Silent American drama films
American silent feature films
Associated Exhibitors films
1910s English-language films
Lost American films
Melodrama films
Lost drama films
Universal Pictures films
1910s American films